Aung Kyaw Htet (born 1965) is a painter from Myanmar. His paintings of religious life in Myanmar show monks and nuns in a realistic manner, though non-essential objects are omitted from the paintings.

Biography
Aung Kyaw Htet  was born in 1965 in Myaungmya and studied at the State School of Fine Arts in Yangon, after working on a river boat for years in order to save enough money for his art education. His paintings of religious life in Myanmar show monks and nuns in a realistic manner, though non-essential objects are omitted from the paintings. He has participated in several exhibitions internationally. His paintings are in the museum collections of the National Museum of Myanmar and the National Art Gallery of Malaysia. His work is now exclusively shown at the Thavibu Gallery in Bangkok.

References

External links
Aung Kyaw Htet on River Gallery

Living people
1965 births
Burmese painters
Burmese performance artists